Lindern is a municipality in the district of Cloppenburg, in Lower Saxony, Germany. It is situated approximately 20 km west of Cloppenburg.

References

Cloppenburg (district)